Guðni Kjartansson (born 10 December 1946) is an Icelandic football manager and former player, who played as a defender. He managed the Iceland national team from 1980 to 1981.

References

Living people
1946 births
Association football defenders
Gudni Kjartansson
Gudni Kjartansson
Gudni Kjartansson
Gudni Kjartansson
Gudni Kjartansson
Gudni Kjartansson
Gudni Kjartansson